Christian Bisceglia (born 18 November 1967) is an Italian film director and screenwriter. He was born in a small town near Milan, but he is Messinese of adoption.

Biography
In 2019, he shoots in English, directed in collaboration with the director Ascanio Malgarini, the film Cruel Peter, a horror film set in his Messina. The film premiered at the Ancient theatre of Taormina on the occasion of the annual Taormina Film Fest. The director, is ever more active in the United States, and the movie will be released in US cinemas (and on demand) in 2020, distributed by Vertical Entertainment.

Selected filmography
 Agente matrimoniale (2006)
 The Haunting of Helena (2012)
 Cruel Peter (2019)

References

External links

1967 births
Living people
Italian film directors
Italian screenwriters